Food Insurance, or FoodInsurance.com, is a company based in Kaysville, Utah, that sells emergency food supply products online. The company was founded in 2009 by Justen Ericksen and Jason Lindsey. The current CEO is Mark Hyland.

The U.S. Federal Emergency Management Agency (FEMA) recommends that everyone have an emergency plan and disaster kit. Food Insurance was initially started following Hurricane Katrina and other global disasters. Originally, Food Insurance only offered emergency kits to help people follow FEMA's guidelines. It has since expanded its product offering to include long-term emergency food supplies and non-food emergency supplies.

Since its founding, Food Insurance has been endorsed by conservative talk radio show hosts Glenn Beck and Sean Hannity. These endorsements have given Food Insurance national recognition. It has also been the cause of some controversy as some have claimed that Glenn Beck is trying to profit from people's fears.

Emergency preparedness 
With the emergence of groups such as American Preppers Network and shows like Doomsday Preppers, emergency preparedness has become mainstream. These groups believe in living in such a way as to be prepared for both natural, economic and political disasters.

Criticism 
There has also been criticism of the prepper movement and of Food Insurance as being unnecessary. Included among the detractors is Stephen Colbert of The Colbert Report on Comedy Central. Critics speak to the futility of owning an emergency food supply in the event of a global nuclear catastrophe.

Recognitions and charity work 
Food Insurance was recognized as having the best tasting gourmet meals by the Food Storage Reviewer.

Food Insurance received a 10 out of 10 by the Food Storage Reviewer in the category of Shelf-Life.

In September 2011, Food Insurance hosted a fundraiser on its Facebook page for the Special Operations Warrior Foundation.

In November 2011, Food Insurance hosted a fundraiser for the Fisher House Foundation on its Facebook page.

In February 2012, Food Insurance hosted a fundraiser on its Facebook page for the American Heart Association.

In June 2012, Food Insurance hosted a fundraiser on its Facebook page for Homes For Our Troops.

Products 
Food Insurance's long-term meal plans use Freeze-dried food, providing complete meals as well as individual freeze-dried ingredients. Food Insurance also sells emergency supplies such as water filters and emergency stoves.

Emergency kits 
The emergency kits Food Insurance offers generally contain a two-week supply of food for one adult, a heat source, a first-aid kit, and a water filter. These kits were designed to follow FEMA's guidelines.

References 

Food and drink companies of the United States
Food and drink companies established in 2009
2009 establishments in Utah